Michael "Krusher" Krushelnyski (born April 27, 1960) is a Canadian former professional ice hockey centre/left winger who played 14 years in the National Hockey League (NHL). While playing in the NHL, he won three Stanley Cups as a player with the Edmonton Oilers and one as an Assistant Coach with the Detroit Red Wings. In a career of 897 games, Krushelnyski recorded 241 goals and 328 assists for 569 career points. He was born in Montreal, Quebec, but grew up in LaSalle, Quebec.

He is the father of Lehigh Valley Phantoms ice hockey forward Alexander Krushelnyski.

Playing career
As a youth, Krushelnyski played in the 1973 Quebec International Pee-Wee Hockey Tournament with a minor ice hockey team from LaSalle, Quebec. After being selected by the Boston Bruins in the 6th round, 120th overall, in the 1979 NHL Entry Draft, Krushelnyski played for the Springfield Indians and the Erie Blades in the American Hockey League (AHL).

Krushelnyski made his NHL debut on October 24, 1981, against the Montreal Canadiens. During the 1984–85 offseason, the Bruins traded Krushelnyski to the Edmonton Oilers in exchange for Ken Linseman. While playing left wing on the Oilers top line with Wayne Gretzky and Jari Kurri, Krushelnyski finished fourth on the team in scoring as he recorded a new career-high 43 goals and 88 points.

Krushelnyski won three Stanley Cups with the Edmonton Oilers in 1985, 1987, and 1988. Krushelnyski and Marty McSorley were part of the 1988 trade in which Wayne Gretzky (who had personally requested McSorley and Krushelnyski to be part of the trade) was sent to the Los Angeles Kings for two players, draft picks and cash. He later played for the Toronto Maple Leafs and Detroit Red Wings before retiring after the 1995 season.

He is best remembered for scoring an overtime goal as a member of the Kings that eliminated the heavily-favoured and defending Stanley Cup champion Calgary Flames from the 1990 Stanley Cup playoffs in the sixth game of the Smythe Division Semifinal (leading in part to his former team, the Oilers, winning another Stanley Cup at the end of that play-off season). Krushelnyski chipped the puck over Flames goaltender Mike Vernon at 3:14 of the second overtime while lying flat on the ice after being knocked down during a goalmouth scramble. CBC Hockey Night in Canada play-by-play announcer Chris Cuthbert called this goal in a dramatic fashion:

Post-retirement

After retiring, Krushelnyski was an assistant coach with Detroit when they won the Cup in 1997, but left after winning his fourth championship to become head coach of the Central Hockey League's Fort Worth Fire, a post he held until the team folded in 1999.

He coached in the Kontinental Hockey League in 2006-07 and from November 2008 to December 2009 for the Vityaz Chekhov. In between his two stints with the KHL, he was coach of the Ingolstadt Panthers in Germany, the DEL

In 2013, Krushelnyski competed in the 4th season of CBC's figure skating reality show Battle of the Blades. He was voted out on October 7, losing to Oksana Kazakova and Vladimir Malakhov.

Awards and achievements
1984–85 - NHL - Stanley Cup (Edmonton)
1984–85 - NHL - Played in All Star Game
1986–87 - NHL - Stanley Cup (Edmonton)
1987–88 - NHL - Stanley Cup (Edmonton)
1997–98 - NHL - Stanley Cup (Detroit Red Wings) (assistant coach)

Career statistics

References

External links

1960 births
Living people
Anglophone Quebec people
Battle of the Blades participants
Boston Bruins draft picks
Boston Bruins players
Canadian people of Ukrainian descent
Cape Breton Oilers players
Detroit Red Wings coaches
Detroit Red Wings players
Edmonton Oilers players
Erie Blades players
Ice hockey people from Montreal
Los Angeles Kings players
Montreal Juniors players
People from LaSalle, Quebec
Springfield Indians players
Stanley Cup champions
Toronto Maple Leafs players
Canadian ice hockey centres
Canadian ice hockey coaches